This is an adventure television series release from France on 2011. Rani is a French television mini-series in 8 episodes of 52 minutes, directed by Arnaud Sélignac1 and broadcast from December 14, 2011 on the channel France 22. Before being broadcast in France, the series has been in Belgium, on the front page, from August 27, 2011.

Cast 
 Mylène Jampanoï : Jolanne de Valcourt
 Jean-Hugues Anglade : Philippe de Valcourt
 Pascal Demolon : Laroche
 Rémi Bichet : Craig Walker
 Yael Abecassis : Jeanne Dupleix
 Olivier Sitruk : Ranveer Singh
 Emma Reynaud : Laure de Marsac
 Antoine Gouy : Charles de Bussy
 Neena Kulkarni : Queen Mother
 Tom Morton : Robert Clive
 Lio : Madam Rose
 Gabriella Wright : Indra
 Jean-Philippe Écoffey : Joseph-François Dupleix

References

2010s French television miniseries